Guerrero 12, also known as 12th Warrior, is a Mexican documentary film that plans to release in theaters in the winter of 2011 in Mexico. The film is directed by Mexican director Miguel A. Reina and produced by E Corp Studio, and was shot on three continents in high definition digital cinema.

Plot
Beyond the fun and sporty, it is clear that football has become part of the idiosyncrasies of people. In Mexico it is a religion, it is a phenomenon that promotes an inexplicable passion.

Cast 
 Álvaro "El Mago" Romero, The Mexican soccer fan, originally from Morelia, Michoacán, where a museum dedicated to him.
 Mario "Pichojos" Pérez, Currently the coach for only second division team in the state of Guerrero.
 Arturo Brizio, former football (soccer) referee from Mexico.
 Mauricio Cabrera, Analyst and commentator on Medio Tiempo, the most important sports blog in Latin America.
 Luis García, Former football player, national team.
 Jaime Guerrero, Journalist and reporter of presidential source.
 León Krauze, Host of W Radio and a member of the committee of the cultural magazine Letras Libres.
 Andrés Roemer, TV host, political scientist and philanthropist.
 Juan Villoro, Mexican writer and journalist.

Soundtrack listing

External links 
 
 

2011 films
2010s Spanish-language films
Documentary films about association football
Mexican documentary films
Football in Mexico
2010s Mexican films